Leonardo Pinheiro da Conceição (born 6 March 1996), known as Léo Pelé or simply Léo, is a Brazilian professional footballer who plays as a left-back or centre-back for Vasco da Gama.

Career
Léo began his career at Fluminense FC. He was first integrated into the first team towards the end of the 2013 Campeonato Brasileiro Série A, remaining an unused substitute in three matches starting with a 1–1 draw against AA Ponte Preta at the Maracanã Stadium on 19 October.

He made his professional debut in the same tournament two years later, playing the full 90 minutes as the team lost 1–0 at Sport Club do Recife on 13 September 2015; after the game, he and Marcos Júnior were castigated by fans who said "You need to bleed for the team...this isn’t Vasco". In total he made six appearances for Flu, all but one as a starter.

On 31 January 2016, he made his debut in the Campeonato Carioca, starting in a 3–1 loss at Volta Redonda Futebol Clube in the first game of the season. On 17 February, he was awarded a new contract until the end of 2019.

On 5 December 2018, Léo Pelé moved to São Paulo FC on a four-year deal for a fee of $3 million.

On 21 December 2022, Léo Pelé was transferred to Vasco from São Paulo FC, in a R$ 16 million deal for a 3-year contract.

Career statistics

Honours
São Paulo
Campeonato Paulista: 2021

References

External links

1996 births
Living people
Footballers from Rio de Janeiro (city)
Brazilian footballers
Association football defenders
Campeonato Brasileiro Série A players
Campeonato Brasileiro Série B players
Fluminense FC players
Londrina Esporte Clube players
Esporte Clube Bahia players
São Paulo FC players
CR Vasco da Gama players